USS Queen City was a steamer acquired by the Union Navy during the American Civil War. She was used by the Navy as a gunboat and assigned to patrol navigable waterways of the Confederacy to prevent the South from trading with other countries.

Service history

Queen City, a wooden, side wheel steamer, was purchased by the Union Navy at Cincinnati, Ohio, from Samuel Wiggins, on 13 February 1863. The vessel was commissioned at Cincinnati on 1 April 1863, Acting Master Jason Goudy in command.

The "tinclad" gunboat (No. 26) operated tip the Tennessee River supporting Union Army operations in the area through the spring. In the summer she transferred to the Mississippi River and patrolled the river protecting Union lines of supply and communications. On 13 October she departed Helena, Arkansas, and carried troops to Friars Point, Mississippi, where they landed and surrounded the town. The next morning they seized a large quantity of cotton.

Capture 

In ensuing months, she continued operations along the rivers of Arkansas. Off Clarendon, Arkansas, on 24 June, two regiments of Confederate cavalry supported by artillery attacked Queen City disabling the paddle wheel steamer arid forcing her commander to surrender. When  attempted to recover the ship, the Confederates blew her up.

See also

Anaconda Plan
Mississippi Squadron

References

External links 
 Photo gallery at navsource.org

Ships of the Union Navy
Steamships of the United States Navy
Gunboats of the United States Navy
American Civil War patrol vessels of the United States
Shipwrecks of the American Civil War
Shipwrecks in rivers
Maritime incidents in June 1864